Tibetan Muslims, also known as the Kachee (also spelled Kache), form a small minority in Tibet. Despite being Muslim, they are officially recognized as Tibetans by the government of the People's Republic of China, unlike the Hui Muslims, who are separately recognized. The Tibetan word Kachee literally means Kashmiri and Kashmir was known as Kachee Yul (Yul means Country). The Muslim community in Tibet is very diverse, with Muslims being of Tibetan, Nepalese and Indian (Kashmiri and Ladakhi) ancestry.

History

Early history 

The first contacts between Tibet and the Islamic world began around the mid-eighth century when it grew out of a combination of trade via the Silk Road and the military presence of Muslim forces in the Fergana Valley. Despite the vague knowledge the Islamic world had about Tibet, there were a few early Islamic works that mention Tibet. One such source is from a work authored by Abu Sa'id Gardezi titled Zayn al-Akhbar. In it, the work mentions the environment, fantastical origin of the Tibetans (through the Himyarites), the divinity of the king, major resources (like musk) and a description of the trade routes to and from Tibet. Another source, Hudud al-'Alam (The Regions of the World) written by an unknown author in 982 or 983 in Afghanistan, contains mainly geography, politics and brief descriptions of Tibetan regions, cities, towns and other localities. This source has the first direct mention of the presence of Muslims in Tibet by stating that Lhasa had one mosque and a small Muslim population. 

During the reign of Sadnalegs (799-815), there was a protracted war against Arab powers to the West. It appears that Tibetans captured a number of Arab troops and pressed them into service on the eastern frontier in 801. Tibetans were active as far west as Samarkand and Kabul. Arab forces began to gain the upper hand, and the Tibetan governor of Kabul submitted to the Arabs and became a Muslim about 812 or 815.

Fourteenth century to present 
Extensive trade with Kashmir, Ladakh, and Baltistan also brought Muslims to Tibet especially after the adoption or growing presence of Islam in these regions starting from the fourteenth century. The ongoing growth of Muslims continued as an effect of the Tibetan-Ladakhi treaty of 1684 in which the Tibetan government allowed trade missions from Ladakh to enter Lhasa every three years. Many Kashmiri and Ladakhi Muslims joined these missions with some settling in Tibet.

During the reign of the Dalai Lama Ngawang Lobsang Gyatso (1617–1682), a permanent Muslim community settled down in Tibet. They were permitted to elect their own council of representatives, settle their group's legal disputes with Islamic law, and some land was donated to them for the construction of a mosque close to Lhasa. The community soon adopted aspects of Tibetan culture like dress, diet, and the Tibetan language.

An influx of Kashmiri Muslims in Nepal (originally having trade contacts with their kin in Tibet) fled to Tibet starting from 1769 due to the invasion of the Kathmandu Valley by Prithvi Narayan Shah. As early as the seventeenth century, Ningxia and other northwestern Hui (Chinese Muslims) began to settle in the eastern regions of Tibet (like in Amdo). They intermarried with the local Tibetans and continued to have to extensive trade contacts with other Muslims inside China.

Another recent wave of new Muslim settlers began after the Dogra conquest of Tibet in 1841. Many Kashmiri, Balti and Ladakhi Muslim troops (who were taken as prisoners when fighting against the Dogra army) stayed behind to settle in Tibet. A few Hindu Dogras also settled in Tibet and subsequently converted to Islam.

Outside of the Lhasa area, smaller Muslim communities and mosques exists in Shigatse, Tsetang, and Chengguan.

After the Chinese conquest of Tibet in 1950, the Tibetan Muslims faced brutal persecution just like their Buddhist brethren. Since then, Chinese Muslims (along with the Han and others) have settled in Tibet. The Chinese government classified the Tibetan Muslims as Hui. However, the Tibetan Muslims are often called Zang Hui (Tibetan Hui) as they speak Tibetan and have a material culture almost identical to their Buddhist counterparts. The Tibetan Hui in Lhasa (unlike other Tibetan Muslims living elsewhere) consider themselves to be very different from the Chinese Muslims and sometimes marry with other Tibetans (including Buddhists) instead of their fellow Muslims from China.

Question of citizenship 
In 1959, Prime Minister Jawaharlal Nehru had come to the conclusion that the Barkor Khache were Indian citizens. The first letter written by the Barkor Khache community in Lhasa was to Tibetan Muslims in Kalimpong in 1959:

The Chinese government attempted to coerce the Barkor Khache into accepting Chinese citizenship and giving up their claims to Indian citizenship. They were initially prevented by China from emigrating to India. The Chinese authorities harassed them, beat them, subjected them to arbitrarily high taxes and told them to attend "indoctrination meetings. On September 2, 1960, Chinese leaders announced that the Barkor Khache would be allowed to leave. The Barkor Khache began leaving later that month to India, via the Kingdom of Sikkim. The Wapaling Khaches also demanded that they be allowed to emigrate to India, but the Chinese authorities refused.

After the 1959 Tibetan uprising, the state government of Jammu and Kashmir granted permanent resident/state subject status to Tibetan Muslim refugees. Voting rights for the Jammu and Kashmir legislative assembly were also granted by the government.

Converts in Qinghai 
Islam was spread by the Salar people to the formerly Buddhist Kargan Tibetans in Lamo-shan-ken. Some Tibetans in Qinghai who converted to Islam are now considered Hui people.

Near the Tibetan village of Skya Rgya in Qinghai, Muslims live around the Yellow river in the town of Dong sna 20 kilometers away and they are registered by the Chinese government as Hui. The elderly "Hui" in this village speak imperfect Chinese but speak perfect Tibetan and trade frequently with the Tibetans, saying they were originally Tibetans. One of them, a man born in 1931 said "We have the same blood; we have the same ancestors. We used to marry each other, shared the same customs and observed the same traditional principles. It was Ma Bufang who converted us to Islam."

Tibetans and the Salars 
After the Salars moved to Xunhua, they converted Tibetan women to Islam and the Tibetan women were taken as wives by Salar men. A Salar wedding ritual where grains and milk were scattered on a horse by the bride was influenced by Tibetans. 

Tibetan women were the original wives of the first Salars to arrive in the region as recorded in Salar oral history. The Tibetans agreed to let their women marry Salar men after putting up several demands to accommodate cultural and religious differences. Hui and Salar intermarry due to cultural similarities and following Islam. Older Salars married Tibetan women but younger Salars prefer marrying other Salars. Han and Salar mostly do not intermarry with each other. Salars however use Han surnames. Salar patrilineal clans are much more limited than Han patrilineal clans in how much they deal with culture, society or religion. Salars almost exclusively took non-Salar women as wives like Tibetan women while never giving Salar women to non-Salar men in marriage except for Hui men who were allowed to marry Salar women. As a result Salars are heavily mixed with other ethnicities.

Salars in Qinghai live on both banks of the Yellow river, south and north, the northern ones are called Hualong or Bayan Salars while the southern ones are called Xunhua Salars. The region north of the Yellow river is a mix of discontinuous Salar and Tibetan villages while the region south of the yellow river is solidly Salar with no gaps in between, since Hui and Salars pushed the Tibetans on the south region out earlier. Tibetan women who converted to Islam were taken as wives on both banks of the river by Salar men. Tibetans witness Salar life passages in Kewa, a Salar village and Tibetan butter tea is consumed by Salars there as well. Other Tibetan cultural influences like Salar houses having four corners with a white stone on them became part of Salar culture as long as they were not prohibited by Islam. Hui people started assimilating and intermarrying with Salars in Xunhua after migrating there from Hezhou in Gansu due to the Chinese Ming dynasty ruling the Xunhua Salars after 1370 and Hezhou officials governed Xunhua. Many Salars with the Ma surname appear to be of Hui descent since many Salars now have the Ma surname while in the beginning the majority of Salars had the Han surname. Some example of Hezhou Hui who became Salars are the Chenjia (Chen family) and Majia (Ma family) villages in Altiuli where the Chen and Ma families are Salars who admit their Hui ancestry. Marriage ceremonies, funerals, birth rites and prayer were shared by both Salar and Hui as they intermarried and shared the same religion since more and more Hui moved into the Salar areas on both banks of the Yellow river. Many Hui women married Salar men and eventually it became far more popular for Hui and Salar to intermarry due to both being Muslims than to non-Muslim Han, Mongols and Tibetans. The Salar language and culture however was highly impacted in the 14th-16th centuries in their original ethnogenesis by marriage with Mongol and Tibetan non-Muslims with many loanwords and grammatical influence by Mongol and Tibetan in their language. Salars were multilingual in Salar and Mongol and then in Chinese and Tibetan as they trade extensively in the Ming, Qing and Republic of China periods on the yellow river in Ningxia and Lanzhou in Gansu.

Salars and Tibetans both use the term maternal uncle ( in Salar and Chinese,  in Tibetan) to refer to each other, referring to the fact that Salars are descendants of Tibetan women marrying Salar men. After using these terms they often repeat the historical account how Tibetan women were married by 2,000 Salar men who were the first Salars to migrate to Qinghai. These terms illustrate that Salars were viewed separately from the Hui by Tibetans. According to legend, the marriages between Tibetan women and Salar men came after a compromise between demands by a Tibetan chief and the Salar migrants. The Salar say Wimdo valley was ruled by a Tibetan and he demanded the Salars follow 4 rules in order to marry Tibetan women. He asked them to install on their houses's four corners Tibetan Buddhist prayer flags, to pray with Tibetan Buddhist prayer wheels with the Buddhist mantras and to bow before statues of Buddha. The Salars refused those demands saying they did not recite mantras or bow to statues since they believed in only one creator god and were Muslims. They compromised on the flags in houses by putting stones on their houses' corners instead of Tibetan Buddhist prayer flags. Some Tibetans do not differentiate between Salar and Hui due to their Islamic religion. Salars were bilingual in Salar and Tibetan due to intermarriage with Tibetan women and trading. It is far less likely for a Tibetan to speak Salar. Tibetan women in Xiahe also married Muslim men who came there as traders before the 1930s. 

In eastern Qinghai and Gansu there were cases of Tibetan women who stayed in their Buddhist Lamaist religion while marrying Chinese Muslim men and they would have different sons who would be Buddhist and Muslims, the Buddhist sons became Lamas while the other sons were Muslims. Hui and Tibetans married Salars.

The later Qing dynasty and Republic of China Salar General Han Youwen was born to a Tibetan woman named Ziliha and a Salar father named Aema.
 
Tibetan and non-Tibetan Muslim men sometimes marry Ladakhi Tibetan Buddhist women in Ladakh.

Balti people 

The Balti people of Baltistan in Pakistan and Kargil in India are descendants of Tibetan Buddhists who  converted to the Noorbakshia sect of Islam. With the passage of time a large number converted to Shia Islam, and a few converted to Sunni Islam. Balti people are ethnically Muslims of Tibetan ancestry. Their Balti language is highly archaic and conservative and closer to Classical Tibetan than other Tibetan languages. The Balti are speakers of a conservative Tibetan dialect in northern Pakistan, Baltistant. Most other Tibetan dialects lost Classical Tibetan consonant clusters that are preserved in Balti. However DNA testing revealed that while Tibetan  mtDNA makes up the majority of the Balti's female ancestry, the Balti paternal ancestry has foreign Near Eastern Y haplogroups of non-Tibetan origin.

See also 
 Islam in China
 Uyghurs
 Hui people
 Dungan people
 Salar people
 Balti people
 Nepalese Muslims
 Sectarian tensions among Muslims in China

References

Citations

Sources 

 Akasoy, Anna; Burnett, Charles; Yoeli-Tlalim, Ronit. (2016). Islam and Tibet: interactions along the musk routes. Routledge, 2016. .
 Atwill, David G. "Boundaries of Belonging: Sino-Indian Relations and the 1960 Tibetan Muslim Incident." The Journal of Asian Studies 75, no. 03 (August 2016): 595–620, .

 Sheikh, Abdul Ghani. (1991). "Tibetan Muslims." The Tibet Journal. Vol. XVI, No. 4. Winter, 1991, pp. 86–89.
 Siddiqui, Ataullah. (1991). "Muslims of Tibet." The Tibet Journal. Vol. XVI, No. 4. Winter, 1991, pp. 71–85.

External links 
 Tibetan Muslims
 Islam in Tibet: Preface by His Holiness The Dalai Lama; Including 'Islam in the Tibetan Cultural Sphere'; 'Buddhist and Islamic Viewpoints of Ultimate Reality'; and The Illustrated Narrative 'Tibetan Caravans'- Fons Vitae books
 Islam in Tibet 'The Ornaments of Llasa' Video – Fons Vitae books
 Gallery of Tibet (Includes picture of a Minaret)
 Mosque in Lhasa
 Islam and Tibet: cultural interactions, 8th to 17th centuries
 Exploring Ethnicities: A Sociological Profile Of Tibetan Muslim Community In Kashmir Valley – Analysis
 A minority within a minority: Nepal's Tibetan Muslims mark Ramadan

Tibetan people
Muslim communities of China
Ethnic groups in China
Religion in Tibet
Indian diaspora by country
Ethnic groups in Tibet